The Wisconsin Department of Financial Institutions (DFI) is an agency of the Wisconsin state government responsible for state regulation of financial institutions and educating the public about financial issues.

The department headquarters are located at the Hill Farms State Office Building on the west side of Madison, Wisconsin. The current secretary of the Wisconsin Department of Revenue is Kathy Blumenfeld. She was appointed by Governor Tony Evers in January 2019.

History
The Constitution of Wisconsin, approved in 1848, specified in Article XI, Sections 4 and 5, that no banking law could be enacted in the state without a statewide amendment ratifying the change. Under this procedure, in 1852, the Wisconsin Legislature passed 1852 Wisc. Act 479 which first authorized the establishment of banks in the state and created the Office of Bank Comptroller—a statewide elected official empowered to oversee and regulate the issuance of bank notes. The act was ratified by referendum in the Spring of 1853, and the first State Bank Comptroller, James S. Baker, was appointed by Governor Leonard J. Farwell.  

The Bank Comptroller was abolished in 1868 and its responsibilities transferred to a bank examiner in the Office of the State Treasurer of Wisconsin, where those duties remained until 1903. In 1902, Wisconsin voters approved an amendment to the State Constitution significantly altering Article XI, Section 4, to allow more flexibility for the Legislature in regulating banks. The 1903 Legislature then passed 1903 Wisc. Act 234, which established a State Banking Department. Regulation of securities and credit unions were introduced in 1913 with 1913 Wisc. Act 733 and 1913 Wisc. Act 756. Credit union regulation was assigned to the State Banking Department; regulation of securities, however, was assigned to the State Railroad Commission until 1939, when a State Department of Securities was established (1939 Wisc. Act 68).

The next major evolution occurred in the 1967 executive branch reorganization, which abolished the State Banking Department and the Department of Securities, creating a Commissioner for Banking and Commissioner for Securities. A separate Commissioner of Credit Unions was created in 1971. 

The current Department of Financial Institutions was created by 1995 Wisc. Act 27. The commissioners for banking, securities, and credit unions were absorbed as separate divisions within the new state agency.

Organization

Leadership
The senior leadership of the Department consists of the Secretary, Deputy Secretary, and Assistant Deputy Secretary, along with the administrators heading up the divisions of the Department.
 Secretary: Kathy Blumenfeld
 Deputy Secretary: Cheryll Olson-Collins
 Assistant Deputy Secretary: Catherine Haberland
 Administrative Services and Technology: Mike Trepanier
 Banking: John Grande
 Corporate and Consumer Services: Patti Epstein
 Securities: Leslie Van Buskirk
 Credit Unions: Kim Santos

Divisions

Office of the Secretary
Subdivisions include:
 Communications Director
 Office of Legal Counsel
 Office of Financial Literacy

Division of Administrative Services and Technology
The Division of Administrative Services and Technology manages the department's budget, personnel, procurement, and technology services.

Division of Banking
The Division of Banking charters, examines, and regulates state-chartered banks savings institutions and consumer financial services industries. They also provide the licensing service for all entities involved in loan origination activities, collections agencies, payday lenders, and other such businesses. They also investigate applications for expanded bank powers, new financial products, and interstate bank acquisitions and mergers.

The Division also administers the Wisconsin Consumer Act, which handles consumer complaints and advises consumers and lenders on their rights and responsibilities under the law.

Division of Corporate and Consumer Services
The Division of Corporate and Consumer Services is responsible for examining and filing documents and business records for corporations and other such entities operating in Wisconsin. They examine business charters, documentation for mergers, consolidations, and dissolutions, and annual reports. They also review documents filed under the Uniform Commercial Code and maintain the state's Uniform Commercial Code lien system.

In addition, they evaluate the notary public applications and renewals, trademark registrations, and cable or video service franchise registrations, as well as professional employer organizations, charitable organizations, and professional fund-raisers.

Division of Securities
The Division of Securities regulates the sale of investment securities and franchises, and handles registrations and required notice filings for offerings. In addition, they register and perform regular examination of agents involved in securities trading, including broker-dealers and investment advisors. They also investigate any complaints or violations and initiates appropriate response actions.

Subordinate boards
Separate from the ordinary organizational structure of the Department, there are a number of specific commissions created by acts of the Wisconsin Legislature to oversee, advise, or administer certain functions. 
 Banking Review Board
 Savings Institutions Review Board

Attached independent entities

Office of Credit Unions
The Office of Credit Unions regulates state-chartered credit unions. It charters new credit unions, examines their records and assets, and handles certain credit union requests and approvals. If a credit union falls out of compliance with state law, the office may remove its officers, suspend its operations, or take possession of the business.

College Savings Program Board
The College Savings Program Board administers the state's Edvest and Tomorrow's Scholar tax-advantaged investment accounts used to save for college expenses.

Secretaries and Commissioners

Bank Comptrollers (1853–1868)

Bank Examiners under the State Treasurer (1895–1903)

Commissioners of the State Banking Department (1903–1933)

Members of the three-man Banking Commission (1933–1947)

Commissioners of Banking (1947–1996)

Secretaries (1996–present)

References

External links
 Wisconsin Department of Financial Institutions

Financial Institutions
Government agencies established in 1996
1996 establishments in Wisconsin